Composite Capability/Preference Profiles (CC/PP) is a specification for defining capabilities and preferences of user agents (also known as "delivery context"). The delivery context can be used to guide the process of tailoring content for a user agent.

CC/PP is a vocabulary extension of the Resource Description Framework (RDF). The CC/PP specification is maintained by the W3C's Ubiquitous Web Applications Working Group (UWAWG) Working Group.

History 
 Composite Capability/Preference Profiles (CC/PP): Structure and Vocabularies 1.0 became a W3C recommendation on 15 January 2004.
 A "Last-Call Working-Draft" of CC/PP 2.0 was issued in April 2007

See also 
 Resource Description Framework (RDF)
 User Agent Profile (UAProf)
 Wireless Universal Resource File (WURFL)

External links 
 W3C CC/PP Information Page
 Newest version of CC/PP: Structure and Vocabularies
 Composite Capability/Preference Profiles (CC/PP): Structure and Vocabularies 1.0
 W3C Device Independence working group
 CC/PP: Structure and Vocabularies Test Suite
 CC/PP: Structure and Vocabularies Implementation Report
 CC/PP presentation
 Sun J2EE CC/PP Processing Tools

Knowledge representation
World Wide Web Consortium standards